BRET may refer to:

Background Radiation Equivalent Time
Bioluminescence resonance energy transfer